Gao Fang (born 6 March 1988) is a Chinese Paralympic athlete. She won the gold medal in the women's 100 metres T53 event at the 2020 Summer Paralympics held in Tokyo, Japan.

References

External links
 

Living people
1988 births
Chinese female sprinters
Athletes (track and field) at the 2020 Summer Paralympics
Medalists at the 2020 Summer Paralympics
Paralympic athletes of China
Paralympic bronze medalists for China
Paralympic medalists in athletics (track and field)
Female competitors in athletics with disabilities
Paralympic wheelchair racers
World Para Athletics Championships winners
Athletes from Shaanxi
21st-century Chinese women